UFC Fight Night: Nogueira vs. Nelson (also known as UFC Fight Night 39) was a mixed martial arts event held on April 11, 2014, at du Arena in Abu Dhabi, United Arab Emirates.

Background
A heavyweight bout between Roy Nelson and Antônio Rodrigo Nogueira headlined this event.

The event was the second that the organization hosted in Abu Dhabi, after UFC 112 in 2010. The event was also the first UFC and MMA event held at the du Arena.

A flyweight bout between Alptekin Özkiliç and Dustin Ortiz was expected to take place on this card. However, on April 3, the fight was cancelled due to injury to Özkiliç.

A middleweight bout between Chris Camozzi and Andrew Craig was expected to take place on this card, however the fight was cancelled on the day of the weigh-ins as Craig was ruled out with an illness. Despite the cancellation, the UFC announced that both fighters would receive their show money for the bout.

Results

Bonus awards
The following fighters were awarded $50,000 bonuses:
 Fight of the Night: Clay Guida vs. Tatsuya Kawajiri
 Performance of the Night: Roy Nelson and Ramsey Nijem

See also
List of UFC events
2014 in UFC

References

UFC Fight Night
Mixed martial arts in the United Arab Emirates
Sports competitions in Abu Dhabi
2014 in mixed martial arts